Denis Sergeyevich Strelkov (born 26 October 1990) is a race walker. He won the bronze medal in the 20-kilometre walk at the 2014 European Championships in Athletics.  He continues to be coached by Viktor Chegin, after he has been suspended for a lengthy series of performance-enhancing drug suspensions against many of his athletes.

Doping case
In September 2015 IAAF confirmed that Strelkov was provisionally suspended after a sample from an out-of-competition control in Saransk in June had been found positive for a prohibited substance.

Competition record

See also
List of doping cases in athletics

References

External links 

1990 births
Living people
Russian male racewalkers
Universiade gold medalists in athletics (track and field)
Universiade gold medalists for Russia
Universiade bronze medalists for Russia
Medalists at the 2013 Summer Universiade
European Athletics Championships medalists
Russian Athletics Championships winners
Doping cases in athletics
Russian sportspeople in doping cases